The Partenavia P.53 Aeroscooter was a 1950s Italian single-seat light aircraft fitted with a two-bladed rotor. It was designed by Luigi Pascale with Mario de Bernardi and built by Partenavia.

Design and development
The Aeroscooter was low-wing monoplane powered by a  Ambrosini P-25 piston engine in the nose. It had a fixed nose-wheel landing gear. Above the enclosed single-seat cockpit a pylon was to have been fitted with an autorotating, unpowered two-bladed rotor which was to reduce the stalling speed and the rate-of-descent if the engine failed.

Only one Aeroscooter was built and it first flew on 2 April 1951 without the rotor fitted. The Aeroscooter survives and is on display at the Museo Storico Dell Aeronautico Militare Italiana. A two-seat derivative was produced by Mario de Baernardi as the de Bernardi M.d.B. 02 Aeroscooter.

Variants
 De Bernardi M.d.B. 02 Aeroscooter – The two seat follow on aircraft designed by De Bernardi.

Specifications (Ambrosini engine, no rotor)

References

Notes

Bibliography

Aeroscooter
1950s Italian civil utility aircraft
Low-wing aircraft
Single-engined tractor aircraft
Aircraft first flown in 1951